Philip I, also known as Philip of Saint Pol (25 July 1404 – Leuven, 4 August 1430), was the younger son of Antoine, Duke of Brabant and Jeanne of Saint-Pol. He succeeded his brother John IV as Duke of Brabant in 1427, while he had inherited Saint-Pol and Ligny as an appanage on the death of his maternal grandfather, Waleran III of Luxembourg, Count of Ligny, in 1415.

He commanded the Burgundian forces occupying Paris in 1419, but he returned to Brabant in 1420, where the populace complained of his brother's misadministration. He was then declared ruwaard (regent) of Brabant. In 1421, he was reconciled with his brother and resigned the regency. The citizens were pacified by John's "Nieuw Regiment" in 1422.

During his own reign, Philip was forced to grant concessions to the nobility in 1428. Wary of the rise of his cousin and heir Philip the Good in the Hook and Cod wars, he sought a marital alliance with Louis II, Duke of Anjou, against Burgundy, marrying his daughter Yolande of Anjou.
 
Because this marriage produced no children, his death in 1430 placed Brabant in the hands of his cousin Philip the Good, the next heir, whilst Saint-Pol and Ligny went to his great-aunt, Joan of Luxembourg, by proximity of blood. His wife Yolande was placed in the guardianship of Philip the Good, until she remarried in 1431 to Francis I, Duke of Brittany.

References

Sources

Ancestors 

Brabant, Philip of Saint-Pol
Brabant, Philip of Saint-Pol
St Pol, Philip of
St Pol, Philip of
Philip
Philip
House of Valois-Burgundy-Brabant